Niasidji Donou Kokou (born 24 April 1991) is a Togolese footballer who currently plays for Enugu Rangers as a defender or midfielder.

International career
Kokou played his first international game with the senior national team on 15 November 2011 against Guinea-Bissau (1–0), where he was part of the starting squad and played the entire match.

International goals
Scores and results list Togo's goal tally first.

References

External links
 

1991 births
Living people
Togolese footballers
Rangers International F.C. players
Togolese expatriate footballers
Togolese expatriate sportspeople in Nigeria
Expatriate footballers in Nigeria
Togo international footballers
Association football defenders
Association football midfielders
2013 Africa Cup of Nations players
21st-century Togolese people